Lori Dawn Sigurdson  (born January 31, 1961 in Winnipeg, Manitoba) is a Canadian politician who was elected in the 2015 Alberta general election to the Legislative Assembly of Alberta representing the electoral district of Edmonton-Riverview. She served as Minister of Advanced Education and Minister of Labour from May 24, 2015 to February 2, 2016 and as Minister of Seniors and housing until March 20, 2019. MLA Sigurdson was re-elected on April 16, 2019. She is currently the Official Opposition Critic for Seniors and Housing.

Personal life 
Sigurdson holds a Bachelor of Arts in Political Science from the University of Alberta as well as Bachelor and Masters of Social Work degrees from the University of Calgary. Sigurdson served as a social worker, working in child welfare casework as a supervisor in the Government of Alberta public service, a mental health therapist with Alberta Catholic School Services, as well as in community development and social policy. After working in social work for 25 years, Sigurdson was an instructor of social work at the University of Calgary, MacEwan University and NorQuest College.

Sigurdson has also served as the director of the Bissell Centre and the manager of professional affairs for the Alberta College of Social Workers. She was awarded the John Hutton Memorial Award for social action and policy in 2017 for her outstanding contributions to the profession of social work.

Electoral history

2019 general election

2015 general election

2012 general election

References

1960s births
Alberta New Democratic Party MLAs
Living people
Members of the Executive Council of Alberta
Politicians from Edmonton
Politicians from Winnipeg
Women MLAs in Alberta
21st-century Canadian politicians
21st-century Canadian women politicians
Women government ministers of Canada